Go-Back-N ARQ is a specific instance of the automatic repeat request (ARQ) protocol, in which the sending process continues to send a number of frames specified by a window size even without receiving an acknowledgement (ACK) packet from the receiver. It can transmit  frames to the peer before requiring an ACK.

The receiver process keeps track of the sequence number of the next frame it expects to receive. It will discard any frame that does not have the exact sequence number it expects (either a duplicate frame it already acknowledged, or an out-of-order frame it expects to receive later) and will send an ACK for the last correct in-order frame. Once the sender has sent all of the frames in its window, it will detect that all of the frames since the first lost frame are outstanding, and will go back to the sequence number of the last ACK it received from the receiver process and fill its window starting with that frame and continue the process over again.

Go-Back-N ARQ is a more efficient use of a connection than Stop-and-wait ARQ, since unlike waiting for an acknowledgement for each packet, the connection is still being utilized as packets are being sent. In other words, during the time that would otherwise be spent waiting, more packets are being sent. However, this method also results in sending frames multiple times – if any frame was lost or damaged, or the ACK acknowledging them was lost or damaged, then that frame and all following frames in the send window (even if they were received without error) will be re-sent. To avoid this, Selective Repeat ARQ can be used.

Pseudocode 
These examples assume an infinite number of sequence and request numbers.
 N  := window size
 Rn := request number
 Sn := sequence number
 Sb := sequence base
 Sm := sequence max
 
 
 function receiver is
     Rn := 0
     Do the following forever:
         if the packet received = Rn and the packet is error free then
             Accept the packet and send it to a higher layer
             Rn := Rn + 1
         else
             Refuse packet
         Send a Request for Rn
 
 
 function sender is
     Sb := 0
     Sm := N + 1
     Repeat the following steps forever:
         if you receive a request number where Rn > Sb then
             Sm := (Sm − Sb) + Rn
             Sb := Rn
         if no packet is in transmission then
             Transmit a packet where Sb ≤ Sn ≤ Sm.  
             Packets are transmitted in order.

Choosing a window size (N) 

There are a few things to keep in mind when choosing a value for :

 The sender must not transmit too fast.  should be bounded by the receiver’s ability to process packets.
  must be smaller than the number of sequence numbers (if they are numbered from zero to )  to verify transmission in cases of any packet (any data or ACK packet) being dropped.
 Given the bounds presented in (1) and (2), choose  to be the largest number possible.

References

See also 
 Reliable Data Transfer
 Pipeline (software)
 Automatic repeat request
 Computer networking
 Selective Repeat ARQ

External links
 Go-Back-N ARQ demonstration in a Java applet

Logical link control
Error detection and correction

de:ARQ-Protokoll#Go-Back-N
it:Automatic repeat request#Go-Back-N